Jean Constantin (9 February 1923 – 30 January 1997) was French singer, songwriter and composer.

Playing piano and singing his own songs, he was viewed as a great performer and entertainer, being however more famous for the songs he wrote for others.

He wrote several songs that became hits like Mon manège à moi sung by Édith Piaf or Mon truc en plumes sung by Zizi Jeanmaire.

He also wrote several movie scores, most notably the soundtrack of the film classic The 400 Blows (1959).

References

External links 
 

1923 births
1997 deaths
20th-century French composers
French film score composers
French television composers
French male film score composers
Male television composers
Musicians from Paris
20th-century French male singers